2024 World Cup may refer to:

 2024 cricketing world cups
 2024 ICC Men's T20 World Cup, men's twenty20 cricket
 2024 ICC Women's T20 World Cup, women's twenty20 cricket
 2024 Under-19 Cricket World Cup, men's
 2024 FIFA Futsal World Cup
 2024 Hockey5s World Cup, 5-a-side field hockey including goalies

See also
 2024 in sports